Valdete Antoni (born 13 September 1953) is one of the best known Albanian contemporary poets. Lyricism, intimacy, sensitivity, thinking and symbolism define her poetry.

Life

Valdete Antoni was born in Tirana, Albania. She graduated with High Honors from the Tirana University, Faculty of Politics & Juridical Sciences, Department of Journalism (1975). She has been working since 1977 and onwards, at the Tirana Radio, National Radio & Television.

Antoni is the author of a large number of radio dramas, radio shows on art and culture. During her experience as a journalist she has prepared, conducted a noted number of programs related to the history of the ancient civilization, history of arts and symbols, and has published in the written media, a number of articles for art personalities, especially in figurative art.

Antoni is one of the founders and ongoing member of the Albanian Forum of Journalists (2000). In such quality she has organized many workshops, for specialized culture and literacy journalism.

Publications

 Dream in the wall (original title Ëndërr në mur), Pristine, "Ylberi": 1994
 My wall has got a shirt (Muri im ka veshur këmishë), Tirana, "Toena": 1997
 I saw my flight  (E pashë fluturimin tim), Tirana, "Toena": 1999 
 Enter in God’s chest (Hyj në kraharor zoti), Tirana, "Toena": 2001
 Wasted in Light Pole (Tretur në polen drite, Tirana, "Toena": 2005
 Dew Sound (Vesë Tingulli)- Selected poetry, Tirana, "Toena": 2011
 Lady Marmara (Marmara Hanim)- Novel, Tirana, "Toena": 2015
Antoni's poetry is published in the weekly literacy press and monthly culture magazines such as "Mehr Licht", the Anthology of Albanian Poets "Take te Larta", etc.

Awards

 In 1999 the book "I Saw My Flight" ("E pashë fluturimin tim"), has been awarded with the first prize from the Albanian Association of Artists and Writers.
 In 2000, Antoni has been awarded as the Best Radio-Journalist of the Year, by Albanian Cultural Foundation "VELIJA".

Sources

 http://www.rtsh.al
 http://valdete-antoni.blogspot.com/
 http://www.pro-helvetia.org.al/News.htm
 http://www.eurozine.com/journals/mehrlicht/issue/2008-07-29.html
 https://web.archive.org/web/20120320070739/http://www.eurozine.com/journals/mehrlicht/issue/2005-08-16.html
 http://www.ndryshe.com/mat.php?idm=10313
 http://www.rapsodet.com/Poezi/poezi%20II.htm
 http://www.toena.com.al/toena/lista_e_plote_e_botimeve/V.html
 https://www.shtepiaelibrit.com/store/sq/romane/4523-marmara-hanem-valdete-antoni.html

21st-century Albanian poets
Living people
1953 births
People from Tirana
Women in Albania
University of Tirana alumni
Albanian women poets
Albanian women journalists
20th-century Albanian poets
20th-century Albanian women writers
21st-century Albanian women writers